Caroline Ansink (born 8 August 1959 in Amsterdam) is a Dutch musician, music educator and composer.

Biography
Ansink studied music at Utrechts Conservatorium, flute with Abbie de Quant and composition with Joep Straesser. After completing her studies with Docerend Musicus (1985) and Uitvoerend Musicus (1986) degrees, Ansink worked as a flutist with the Clara Schumann Orchestra in Cologne and a music teacher at the Utrechts Conservatorium.

In 1992 Ansink and composer Catharina van Rennes were subjects of a television documentary I compose as a human being by NOS TV.

Awards and honors
1989 Composition Prize
1985 second prize of DEDOK Mannheim
1989 the first prize GEDOK for Pyrrhus for organ (1988), for which she *1988 Cappella Civica award in Trieste
1989 third prize of the Association of Hungarian Musicians
1990 encouragement prize from the Amsterdams Fonds voor de Kunst
1990 honorable mention The Washington International Competition
1992 Prize from the city of Chard, Great Britain

Works
Ansink composes chamber music, orchestral and choir works. Selected works include:
Shades of Silence for string quartet (1984)
Pyrrhus for organ (1988)
SkopÛs piano trio (1989)
Night and Day (1990)
Zeitenschrunde (1990)
Brezze for string quartet (1990)
Capriccio for Solo Violin
Over the Moon

References

1959 births
20th-century classical composers
21st-century classical composers
Dutch women classical composers
Dutch classical composers
Dutch classical musicians
Dutch music educators
Living people
Musicians from Amsterdam
21st-century Dutch musicians
Women music educators
20th-century women composers
21st-century women composers